When the south shore of Maui was first visited by Captain George Vancouver it was dotted with small fishing villages and was said to be a retreat for Hawaiian royalty.  Captain Vancouver was not the first European visitor to Maui, however, a landing site was erected in the form of a large totem pole.  Kihei went mostly untouched for years.     
Captain George Vancouver settled in the Pacific Northwest in the area of the city of his namesake, Vancouver B.C.  On the south Kihei shore the remains of the totem pole monument are present with inscriptions from the Canadian Prime Minister from 1969.

Animal farming introduced to Hawaiians 
Ancient Hawaii had no large land mammals, however, the gift of a few cattle by Captain George Vancouver in 1793 to Kamehameha introduced animal farming and ignited a heritage of cowboy life and ranch culture that is still visible today on many ranches throughout Hawaii.  Vancouver's first voyages to Hawaii were as a junior officer on Cook’s expedition.  From 1792 to 1794 Captain Vancouver and Kamehameha I develop a close relationship that helps Kamehameha rise to power.  According to the marker, in 1793 Vancouver brought the first cattle and root vegetables to Hawaii.  Today, the two largest ranches in Hawaii are Parker Ranch (Big Island) and Molokai Ranch.

In 1794 he granted the right to the Hawaiian people to use the union jack as part of the Hawaiian flag.

Authenticity
The authenticity of this Kihei/Ma'alaea marker dating from 1969 representing Vancouver's landing site is unknown.  While the best sources tell of Vancouver sailing into Maalaea Bay, it is not known whether he actually landed there.  According to The Hawaiian Journal of History, vol. 23 (1989), page 50. in March 1793 Vancouver's "ships entered Maui waters on the island's eastern coast, sailed along the Southern side and up the east where, at Ma'alaea Bay. Kamohomoho, a brother of Kahekili, the ruler of Maui, appeared in a canoe and came on board to pilot the British ships to a safe anchorage at Lahaina."

The marker is in disrepair indicating that it is may not be recognized by any historical or State authority.  Additionally, the marker states that Vancouver brought "root vegetables" to the Islands, however, Taro is a root vegetable and predates Vancouver's visits.  A new hotel is being built on the site and we will see how they treat this marker.  Nevertheless, this marker is important as a reference to Vancouver's journey to these waters.

Gallery

Notes

References
George Vancouver
Kamehameha I
James Cook: Navigation and science

External links

History of Maui